Claude de Thiard de Bissy (13 October 1721, Paris – 26 September 1810, Pierre-de-Bresse) was a French soldier. He served his military career, rising to lieutenant-général des armées du roi in 1762 (the same day as his younger brother Henri, comte de Thiard) and fighting in the conquest of Franche-Comté and becoming governor of Languedoc and Auxonne.

Biography
The son of Claude, 7th count of Bissy (died 2 July 1723) and 
Sylvie Angélique Andrault de Langeron, he was thus a descendant of the poet Pontus de Tyard. He was elected a member of the Académie Française in 1750 and remained a member for 60 years. He wrote a  Histoire d'Ema ou de l'âme (1752).

Bibliography 
Bernard Alis, Les Thiard, guerriers et beaux esprits. Claude et Henri-Charles de Thiard de Bissy, et leur famille, L'Harmattan, Paris, 1997.
 Nouvelle biographie générale. Firmin Didot, 1866.

References

External links
Académie française

1721 births
1810 deaths
Military personnel from Paris
French lieutenant generals
Members of the Académie Française